José Alfredo Ortiz Daliot is a Puerto Rican attorney and politician. He is a former director of the Puerto Rico Federal Affairs Administration (PRFAA) and a former member of the Senate of Puerto Rico.

Ortiz Daliot served as counsel for the city and municipality of Mayagüez, which requested inclusion in the receipt of public works capital when the city closed six sugarmills in the 1970s.

Ortiz Daliot served at PRFAA during Governor Rafael Hernández Colón's administration.

In 2000 he was elected, along with professor Margarita Ostolaza as Senator from the District of San Juan. During his only term in office, Ortiz Daliot authored many laws, including the one that created San Juan's Ecological Corridor.  In 2004, they were defeated in their attempt for reelection by the candidates of the PNP, Roberto Arango and Carlos Díaz.

After the defeat, Ortiz Daliot returned to his private practice. In recent years, he has returned to the public spotlight for being involved with ALAS (Alliance for Free Sovereign Association), an organization dedicated to promoting the development and evolution of the current political status, the Estado Libre Asociado. The organization criticized the position of the Popular Democratic Party, Ortiz' former party, for the 2012 status referendum.

References

American chief executives
Living people
Puerto Rican lawyers
Members of the Senate of Puerto Rico
Popular Democratic Party (Puerto Rico) politicians
Year of birth missing (living people)